The Chevrolet Series C Classic Six  is the first automobile produced by American car manufacturer Chevrolet. It is one of the few Chevrolets made while record-setting Buick race car driver Louis Chevrolet was with the company. This Brass Era Chevy was much larger, more powerful, more stylized and therefore more expensive than the cars that would ultimately replace it. Louis Chevrolet loved it, but William Durant had a cheaper car in mind.

The first Chevrolet

The 1912-14 Chevrolet Type C  also called the Chevrolet Classic Six (Series C), Chevrolet Model C, Classic Six or, at the time it was new, simply the Chevrolet (since there were no other models to confuse it with until 1914 when the Model H and L were released), was the first Chevrolet, and was also sold by other makes. It was a well constructed car and had a 6-cylinder engine up front with a cone clutch and a three-speed gearbox mounted at the rear axle. Henry Ford had been selling his much less expensive Model T for three years, in six models by the time Chevrolet entered the market. The Chevrolets that followed, under the management of Durant, would be much cheaper 4-cylinder cars that competed directly with the T.  The Series C Classic Six, however, was capable of 65 mph and competed against the more high-performance cars of that time. Standard equipment included a starter, four doors, a folding top, a tool box, cowl lights, and electric headlights. 
The 1914 Classic Six was in essence the 1913 model with a few slight changes.

Design

Penned by Etienne Planche under direction from Louis Chevrolet, the Chevy with its low running boards had a design more resembling European cars. Radiator shell and Chevrolet nameplate on the dashboard (the "bow-tie" emblem did not appear until the 1914 Chevrolet Series H and L models) were polished metal, the body, chassis and wheels were only Chevrolet blue. The hood, fenders, and splash aprons were black. Light gray striping was found on the body and wheels. The first prototype car appeared in late 1911, and Louis Chevrolet himself tested it on the back streets of Detroit. Throughout 1912 refinements were made to the design. Later in that same year the new 1913 model was released at the New York Auto Show.

The T-head engine

Chevrolet's first engine was a liquid-cooled 299-cubic-inch, six-cylinder cast-iron block cast in three groups of two, with a T-head configuration, that produced 40 horsepower. The T-head engine is a side valve engine that is distinguished from the much more common L-head engine by its placement of the valves. The intake valves are on one side of the engine block and the exhaust valves on the other, making dual camshafts necessary. Seen from the end of the crankshaft, in cutaway view, the cylinder and combustion chamber resembles a T - hence the name "T-head". The 299 was a very large engine at that time and the only engine in the C Series. In 1913 the ignition was a Simms magneto with a compressed-air starter. For 1914 the ignition was now a Simms High Tension Magneto and the starter used was a Gray & Davis. This was the biggest Chevy engine until the 1958, 348 cid V-8.?

Production notes

The prototype of Planche's design was built in 1911. After several improvements were made to the car, they began production for commercial sales in late 1912. Production continued through 1913 and was stopped in 1914. The base price was US$2,250 ($ in  dollars ).

Production Amount
It is unclear due to conflicting production records as to how many were actually made. Total Chevrolet production for 1913 was 5,987. But this figure included all Little Motor Car Co. production (The Little Motor car was made in the same factory) and could also have included all the 1914 models produced in 1913. It is doubtful given the high price of the car that many were made and sold. The serial number of the below listed existing cars at the Sloan Museum and the Reynolds-Alberta Museum in Canada may or may not be indicative of the exact number built.

Surviving Examples

There are only 2 Classic Sixes known to exist. The oldest example is a 1913 model, serial #93 located in the Reynolds-Alberta Museum in Canada and is an unrestored partial car. 
The other is also a 1913 model, serial #323 located in Flint, Michigan at the Alfred P. Sloan Museum (shown above). This car is the only complete and fully restored running example.

The Sloan Museum car was first purchased in southern Texas, the Classic 6 was driven daily until 1936, when it was bought by the Aldenhaven Family in Ft. Worth (who owned a Chevy dealership). It remained part of their collection until 1964, when it was placed up for auction. The Sloan Museum had been following the car for some time, and sent two employees to Texas with a signed check. The Chevy was twice bid up beyond the Museum's offer, but the Aldenhavens accepted the Museum's offer any way, as they knew the car would be appreciated and well kept.

In Cambodia, Chevrolet Classic Six-like car known as Masthead Car. This car operated for tourists in Angkor temples in Siem Reap.

Related Cars
William Durant assembled these three companies to form Chevrolet:
 The Little Motor Car Company
 The Mason Motor Company
 The Republic Motor Company

Louis Chevrolet left Chevrolet Motor Car Company in 1915, and by 1916 had started a race car company with his brother Gaston Chevrolet.
 The Frontenac Motor Corporation

See also 

 List of Chevrolet vehicles

References

The Washington Post, May 23, 1999
100 Years of the American Auto Millennium Edition

Series C Classic Six
First car made by manufacturer
Cars introduced in 1911
Brass Era vehicles